Trud Stadium is a multi-use stadium in Irkutsk, Russia.  It is currently used mostly for football and bandy matches and it is home to FC Zenit Irkutsk. It was the main venue of the 2014 Bandy World Championship. The stadium holds 16,500 people.

History

"Vanguard" is built on the site burned down the stadium and was originally inherited his title. Construction started in 1951 , completed in 1957. As the labor force used by prisoner.

In October 1957 the Presidium of the All took on another reorganization decision - to move from sectoral to the territorial principle of construction of the DSO, while it was created DSO "Trud" RSFSR, has incorporated several industry DSO. Since the late 1950s former stadium "Avangard" was named "Work"

References

Sports venues built in the Soviet Union
Football venues in Russia
Bandy venues in Russia
FC Zvezda Irkutsk
Bandy World Championships stadiums